Unai Bilbao Arteta (born 4 February 1994) is a Spanish professional footballer who plays as a centre-back for Liga MX club Atlético San Luis. He played for Bilbao Athletic at the professional level in his homeland.

Club career
Born in Bilbao, Biscay, Basque Country, Bilbao made his debut as a senior with Barakaldo CF in 2011, in Segunda División B. In June of that year he joined Athletic Bilbao, returning to the youth setup, but also appearing with the farm team in Tercera División.

On 26 May 2014, Bilbao was promoted to the reserves in the third level. He contributed with 29 appearances and two goals during the season, as the B-side returned to Segunda División after a 19-year absence.

Bilbao made his professional debut on 24 August 2015, starting and being sent off in a 0–1 home loss against Girona FC.

In May 2018, Athletic Bilbao confirmed that Bilbao would leave the club when his contract expired in July; despite having been captain of the reserves and accumulated the most playing minutes among the squad in the preceding season, he was too old to continue with that team and there was no place in the senior squad, with contemporaries Yeray Álvarez and Unai Núñez already promoted ahead of him.

Atlético San Luis
In June 2018, Bilbao agreed to join Atlético San Luis of Mexico's second tier Ascenso MX. In December of the same year, he helped the team to claim the 2018–19 Apertura title, beating Dorados de Sinaloa (coached by Diego Maradona) in the Liguilla final.

Necaxa
On 1 July 2020, Unai Bilbao sign for Necaxa in a season-long loan deal. He made his debut On July 24, against Tigres UANL in the first season game.

Honours
Atlético San Luis
Ascenso MX: Apertura 2018–19

References

External links

1994 births
Living people
Spanish footballers
Footballers from Bilbao
Association football defenders
Segunda División players
Segunda División B players
Tercera División players
Barakaldo CF footballers
CD Basconia footballers
Bilbao Athletic footballers
Atlético San Luis footballers
Ascenso MX players
Spain youth international footballers
Spanish expatriate footballers
Spanish expatriate sportspeople in Mexico
Expatriate footballers in Mexico
Athletic Bilbao footballers